Strother Douglas Martin Jr. (March 26, 1919 – August 1, 1980) was an American character actor who often appeared in support of John Wayne and Paul Newman and in Western films directed by John Ford and Sam Peckinpah. Among Martin's memorable performances is his portrayal of the warden or "captain" of a state prison camp in the 1967 film Cool Hand Luke, in which he utters the line, "What we've got here is failure to communicate." The line is number 11 on the American Film Institute list of 100 Years...100 Movie Quotes.

Early life
Martin was born in Kokomo, Indiana to Ethel (née Dunlap) and Strother Douglas Martin. For a short time, the Martins lived in San Antonio, Texas, but soon returned to Indiana. As a child, he excelled at swimming and diving. He was nicknamed "T-Bone Martin" because of his diving expertise. At 17 he won the National Junior Springboard Diving Championship. He served as a swimming instructor in the United States Navy during World War II and was a member of the diving team at the University of Michigan in Ann Arbor, Michigan. He entered the adult National Springboard Diving competition in hopes of gaining a berth on the U.S. Olympic team, but finished third in the competition.

Acting career
After the war, Martin moved to Los Angeles and worked as a swimming instructor and as a swimming extra in water scenes in films, including the 1950 crime drama The Damned Don't Cry. He earned bit roles in a number of pictures and soon gained frequent character roles in films and television through the 1950s, having appeared in such programs as the Western anthology series Frontier on NBC and the syndicated American Civil War drama Gray Ghost. He was cast in 1955 as Landry Kersh in the episode "Shadow of God" on the ABC religion anthology series Crossroads. Martin also portrays a man with learning difficulties in "Cooter", an episode written by Sam Peckinpah in 1958 for the third season of the long-running Western series Gunsmoke.  The next year on that series he played the character “Dillard” in “The Constable”.

Martin appeared in the first Brian Keith series, Crusader, a Cold War drama on CBS. He guest-starred, as a circus tightrope walker Dooley Delaware, in the 1957 episode "High Wire" in CBS' Have Gun - Will Travel. He portrayed a henpecked soldier in a 1958 episode of the syndicated Western series, Boots and Saddles and starred in a Trackdown episode "A Stone for Benny French". That same year, he played the lead in the episode "Pete Henke" of NBC's Western Jefferson Drum.

In 1959, Martin played Polk, with Denver Pyle as Houston, in the episode "No Place to Stop" of the CBS Western series, The Texan, starring Rory Calhoun as Bill Longley. In another 1959 Western series, Martin was cast as Deputy Jess in the episode "Johnny Yuma" of ABC's The Rebel, starring Nick Adams. In 1960, Martin guest-starred in James Whitmore's ABC crime drama, The Law and Mr. Jones. 

In 1961, Martin portrayed Pete Gibson in the episode "The Case of the Brazen Bequest" on Perry Mason. In 1962, he was cast as Harold Horton in "The Chocolate Cake Caper" of the CBS sitcom, Pete and Gladys, starring Harry Morgan and Cara Williams. He guest-starred in Jack Lord's ABC adventure/drama series, Stoney Burke. In 1963, he was cast as Private Anton Copang in the episode "Walk Through the Badlands" of the ABC/Warner Brothers western series, The Dakotas. In 1966, Martin appeared twice as "Cousin Fletch" in the short-lived ABC comedy Western The Rounders, with Ron Hayes, Patrick Wayne, and Chill Wills.

In 1967, Martin played Arizona miner Ed Schieffelin in the episode "Silver Tombstone" of the syndicated television series Death Valley Days. Martin played villainous roles in many of the best-known Westerns of the 1950s and 1960s, including The Horse Soldiers and The Man Who Shot Liberty Valance. He played an Indian agent in the John Wayne film, McLintock! (1963) and a horse trader in the 1969 film, True Grit (1969).

By the late 1960s, Martin was almost as well-known a figure as many top-billed stars. In 1967, the same year as his role in Cool Hand Luke, he appeared in the episode "A Mighty Hunter Before the Lord" of NBC's The Road West series starring Barry Sullivan. In 1972, he appeared as James Garner's uncle in the "Zacharia" episode of NBC's Nichols. He also had a pronounced physical and vocal resemblance to playwright Tennessee Williams and occasionally parodied him, notably in the "Baby Fat" episode of The Dick Van Dyke Show.

The play The Time of Your Life was revived on March 17, 1972, at the Huntington Hartford Theater in Los Angeles with Martin, Henry Fonda, Richard Dreyfuss, Gloria Grahame, Lewis J. Stadlen, Ron Thompson, Jane Alexander, Richard X. Slattery, and Pepper Martin among the cast with Edwin Sherin directing.

Martin appeared in all three of the classic Westerns released in 1969: Sam Peckinpah's The Wild Bunch (as Coffer, a bloodthirsty bounty hunter), George Roy Hill's Butch Cassidy and the Sundance Kid (as Percy Garris, the "colorful" Bolivian mine boss who hires the two title characters), and Henry Hathaway's True Grit (as Colonel Stonehill, a horse dealer). He frequently acted alongside L.Q. Jones, who in real life was one of his closest friends.

Though he usually appeared in supporting roles, he had major parts in Hannie Caulder (1971), The Brotherhood of Satan (1971), Pocket Money (1972) with Paul Newman and Lee Marvin, and in the horror film SSSSSSS (1973). Martin later appeared in another George Roy Hill film, Slap Shot (1977), again with Paul Newman, as the cheap general manager of the Charlestown Chiefs hockey club. He appeared six times each with John Wayne and Paul Newman. In an interview  originally published in Movietone News in 1981, Martin commented on his professional relationship with both Wayne and Newman:

Martin can also be seen in Cheech and Chong's Up in Smoke (1978) as Arnold Stoner, the father of Tommy Chong's character Anthony.

Martin made many guest appearances on Gunsmoke including the two-part episode "Island in the Desert", in which he portrayed a crazy desert hermit named Ben Snow.  Previously, he guest-starred as Marv Rowley in the 1961 Gunsmoke episode "Tall Trapper" playing an angry man who murders his wife out of jealousy then tries to pin the killing on a quiet, respectful trapper who his wife fell for. 

He also made many guest appearances on Perry Mason throughout the nine-year run from 1957 to 1966, including a horseman in the 1962 episode "The Case of the Fickle Filly", a college employee in "The Case of the Brazen Bequest", and the murderer in "The Case of the Drowsy Mosquito". In 1963, he appeared in Glynis Johns' short-lived comedy series Glynis in the episode "Ten Cents a Dance". In 1965, Martin appeared in the episode "Most Precious Gold" of the NBC comedy/drama series Kentucky Jones, starring Dennis Weaver. In 1965, he guest-starred as Meeker in the episode "Return to Lawrence" on the ABC Western The Legend of Jesse James. In 1966, he guest-starred in the Lost In Space episode "Blast Off Into Space" as a gritty mining engineer named Nerim. On a Gilligan's Island episode, Martin played a man living supposedly alone on the island for a radio show contest. In 1973–1974, he was a regular cast member of the James Stewart legal drama and murder mystery series Hawkins. He also starred in a two-part The Rockford Files 1977 episode as T.T. Flowers "The Trees, the Bees and T. T. Flowers", an episode that took on urban invasion and the environment.

One of his last acting jobs was as host of Saturday Night Live on April 19, 1980. In one of the skits, Martin played the strict owner of a French language camp for children, based on his role as the prison captain from Cool Hand Luke. He even paraphrased his most famous line from the film, "What we have here is failure to communicate BILINGUALLY!" In another, he played a terminally ill man who videotaped his last will and testament. During his monologue, he again did his Tennessee Williams impression. That episode was supposed to be rerun during the summer of 1980, but it was pulled and replaced with another episode due to Martin's death.

Death
Martin was married to Helen Meisels-Martin from 1967 until his death; they had no children. In the last year of his life, Martin was under a doctor's care for cardiac problems. He died at age 61 of a heart attack on August 1, 1980, at Los Robles Regional Medical Center in Thousand Oaks, California.

Filmography

Film

 The Damned Don't Cry (1950) as Springboard Diver (uncredited)
 The Asphalt Jungle (1950) as William Doldy (uncredited)
 Rhubarb (1951) as Michael 'Shorty' McGirk (uncredited)
 The Red Badge of Courage (1951) as Corporal (voice, uncredited)
 Scandal Sheet (1952) as Man on Crutches (uncredited)
 Storm Over Tibet (1952) as Co-Pilot
 Androcles and the Lion (1952) as Soldier (uncredited)
 The Magnetic Monster (1953) as Co-Pilot
 South Sea Woman (1953) as Marine in Audience at Court Martial (uncredited)
 World for Ransom (1954) as Corporal (uncredited)
 Prisoner of War (1954) as Man on Crutches (uncredited)
 A Star is Born (1954) as Delivery Boy (uncredited)
 Drum Beat (1954) as Scotty
 The Silver Chalice (1954) as Father (uncredited)
 Strategic Air Command (1955) as Airman (uncredited)
 Kiss Me Deadly (1955) as Harvey Wallace
 The Big Knife (1955) as Stillman (uncredited)
 Target Zero (1955) as Pvt. Dan O'Hirons (uncredited)
 World Without End (1956) as Nihka (uncredited)
 Johnny Concho (1956) as Townsman (uncredited)
 Attack! (1956) as Sgt. Ingersol
 The Black Whip (1956) as Thorney
 Copper Sky (1957) as Pokey
 Black Patch (1957) as Deputy Petey Walker
 Cowboy (1958) as Cowboy Bitten by Snake (uncredited)
 The Shaggy Dog (1959) as Thurm
 The Wild and the Innocent (1959) as Ben Stocker
 The Horse Soldiers (1959) as Virgil
 Sanctuary (1961) as Dog Boy
 The Deadly Companions (1961) as Parson
 The Man Who Shot Liberty Valance (1962) as Floyd
 Showdown (1963) as Charlie Reeder
 McLintock! (1963) as Agard (Indian Agent)
 Invitation to a Gunfighter (1964) as Fiddler
 Brainstorm (1965) as Mr. Clyde
 Shenandoah (1965) as Train Engineer
 The Sons of Katie Elder  (1965) as Jeb Ross
 Harper (1966) as Claude
 Nevada Smith (1966) as Strother (uncredited)
 An Eye for an Eye (1966) as Trumbull
 The Flim-Flam Man (1967) as Lovick
 Cool Hand Luke  (1967) as The Captain
 True Grit (1969) as Colonel G. Stonehill
 The Wild Bunch (1969) as Coffer
 Butch Cassidy and the Sundance Kid (1969) as Percy Garris
 The Ballad of Cable Hogue (1970) as Bowen
 Red Sky at Morning (1971) as John Cloyd
 The Brotherhood of Satan (1971) as Doc Duncan
 Fools' Parade (1971) as Lee Cotrill
 Hannie Caulder (1971) as Rufus Clemens
 Pocket Money (1972) as Bill Garrett
 SSSSSSS (1973) as Dr. Carl Stoner
 Hard Times (1975) as Poe
 Rooster Cogburn (1975) as Shanghai McCoy
 The Great Scout & Cathouse Thursday (1976) as Billy
 Slap Shot (1977) as Joe McGrath
 The End (1978) as Dr. Waldo Kling
 Up in Smoke (1978) as Arnold Stoner
 Love and Bullets (1979) as Louis Monk
 The Champ (1979) as Riley
 Nightwing (1979) as Selwyn
 The Villain (1979) as Parody Jones
 The Secret of Nikola Tesla (1980) as George Westinghouse
 Hotwire (1980) as The Weasel (final film role)

Television 
Dangerous Assignment – episode – The Venetian Story – Riri (1952)
 Gunsmoke – episode – Professor Lute Bone (1956)
 Gunsmoke – episode – Cooter- Cooter  (1956)
 I Love Lucy – episode – Off To Florida – Coffee Shop Clerk (1956)
 Zane Grey Theater – episode – The Necessary Breed – Telegraph Clerk, Joby (1957)
 Have Gun - Will Travel – episode – A Matter of Ethics – Fred Coombs (1957)
 Have Gun - Will Travel – episode – High Wire – Dooley Delaware (1957)
 The Grey Ghost – episode – Reconnaissance Mission – Michael (1957)
 The Walter Winchell File – Little Jules – "Exclusive Story" (1958)
 Gunsmoke – episode – Dooley Surrenders – Emmett Dooley (1958)
 Trackdown – episode – A Stone for Benny French – Benny French (1958)
 The Rebel – episode – Johnny Yuma – Jess (1959)
 Have Gun - Will Travel – episode – One Came Back – Carew (1959)
 Whirlybirds – episode – Without a Net – The Great Herman (1959)
 The Twilight Zone – episode – The Grave – Mothershed (1961)
 Gunsmoke – episode – Tall Trapper – Marv Rowley (1961)
 Gunsmoke – episode – The Trappers – Beaver skin trapper Billy (1962)
 Have Gun - Will Travel – episode "Lazarus" – Boise Peabody (1962)
 Perry Mason – episode – The case of the Fickle Filly – Joe Mead (1962)
 Perry Mason – episode – The Case of the Brazen Bequest – Pete Gibson (1962)
 Perry Mason – episode – The Case of the Drowsy Mosquito – Gerald Sommers (1963)
 Perry Mason – episode – The Case of the Hasty Honeymooner – Roy Hutchison (1965)
 The Fugitive – episode – Devil's Carnival – Deputy Shirky Saulter (1964)
 Bonanza – episode – The Saga of Muley Jones – Yuri (1964)
 Gunsmoke – episode – No Hands – Will Timble – S.9 E.19 (1964)
 Rawhide – episode – The Gray Rock Hotel – Bates (1965)
 Perry Mason – episode – The Case of the Hasty Honeymooner – Roy Hutchinson (1965)
 The Dick Van Dyke Show – episode – Baby Fat – Harper Worthington Yates (1965)
 Bonanza – episode – The Meredith Smith – Little Meredith Smith (1965)
 Kentucky Jones – episode – Most Precious Gold – Boney Benton (1965)
 The Virginian – episode – The Claim – Finley (1965)
 Death Valley Days – episode The Four Dollar Law Suit – Alfred Hall (1966)
 Lost in Space – episode – Blast Off Into Space – Nerim (1966)
 Death Valley Days – episode – Silver Tombstone – Ed Schieffelin (1967)
 The Guns of Will Sonnet – episode – Message at Noon – Harvey Bains (1967)
 Gilligan's Island – episode – Take A Dare – George Barkley (1967)
 The Big Valley – episode – Brother Love – Fludd (1967)
 The Invaders – episode – Moonshot – Charlie Coogan (1967)
 Gentle Ben – episode – The Opportunist – Reed Olmstock (1967)
 The Guns of Will Sonnet – episode – Joby – Joby (1968)
 It Takes a Thief – episode – Birds of a Feather – Paul Rooney (1968)
 Daniel Boone – episode – The Terrible Tarbots – Tarbot (1969)
 Bonanza – episode – The Silence at Stillwater – Lonnie Stern (1969)
 The Virginian – episode – You Can Lead A Horse To Water – Luther Watson (1970)
 Marcus Welby, M.D. – episode – Nobody Wants a Fat Jockey – Terry Riggs (1970)
 Bonanza – episode – The Imposters – Joad Bruder (1970)
 Bonanza – episode – The Younger Brothers' Younger Brother – Cole Younger (1972)
 Walt Disney's Wonderful World of Color – episodes – The Boy and the Bronc Busters: Parts 1 and 2 (1973)
 Hawkins – 8 episodes (series regular) – R. J. Hawkins (1973–1974)
 Gunsmoke – episode – Island in the Desert: Part 1 and Part 2 – Hermit Ben Snow (1974)
 Movin' On – episode – Long Way to Nowhere – Cabe Miller (1975)
 The Rockford Files – episodes – The Trees, the Bees and T.T. Flowers – Thomas Tyler "T.T" Flowers (1977)
 Vega$ – episode – Yes, My Darling Daughter –  Hank Jenner (1978)
 Saturday Night Live – episode – Strother Martin – host (1980)

References

Further reading
 Beaver, Jim. Strother Martin. Films in Review, November 1982.

External links

 
 
 
 

1919 births
1980 deaths
20th-century American male actors
American male film actors
American male television actors
Burials at Forest Lawn Memorial Park (Hollywood Hills)
Male Western (genre) film actors
Male actors from Indiana
Male actors from Michigan
Military personnel from Indiana
People from Kokomo, Indiana
United States Navy personnel of World War II
United States Navy sailors
University of Michigan alumni
Western (genre) television actors